Honours and awards to Harold Pinter lists (in chronological order) honours, awards, prizes, and honorary degrees received by English playwright Harold Pinter (1930–2008), which often acknowledge his international importance and his reach beyond national and regional boundaries.

Background
Pinter declined a British knighthood in 1996, when it was offered to him on behalf of Queen Elizabeth II by British Prime Minister John Major, then leader of the Conservative Party. Despite his declining it, many in the media (both in the UK and elsewhere) still refer erroneously to Pinter as "Sir Harold Pinter".

In addition to having already been made a Commander of the Order of the British Empire (CBE) in 1966, he accepted the award of Companion of Honour (CH) for services to Literature from the British monarch in 2002.  He was presented the Nobel Prize in Literature in December 2005 and the French Légion d'honneur in January 2007.

He was awarded academic honorary degrees at the University of Leeds, in April 2007 (in person), at which its Humanities faculty processed in full academic garb solely to present the honorary doctorate to Pinter; at the University of Kragujevac, in Serbia; and at the University of Cambridge, in June 2008 (both of the latter in absentia). In December 2007, the British Library announced that it had acquired his literary archive for over £1.1 million (approx. US$2.24 million) on behalf of the British nation.

After having accepted the honorary presidency of the Central School of Speech and Drama, a constituent college of the University of London, in October 2008, he received an honorary fellowship during its honorary degree ceremony, also in absentia, due to ill health, on 10 December 2008, two weeks before his death from cancer on 24 December 2008.

Honours, awards, and prizes
Best Play award for The Caretaker in Evening Standard Theatre Awards, 1960 
Commander of the Order of the British Empire (CBE), 1966
Best Play award for The Homecoming in the Tony Awards, 1967
Shakespeare Prize (Hamburg), 1970
European Prize for Literature (Vienna), 1973
Pirandello Prize (Palermo), 1980
Giles Cooper Award, 1981
Order of Merit (Chile), 1992
America Award, 1995
The David Cohen Prize, 1995
Honorary fellow of Queen Mary, University of London
Laurence Olivier Special Award, 1996
Molière d'honneur, Paris, in recognition of his life's work, 1997
Sunday Times Award for Literary Excellence, 1997
BAFTA Fellowship, 1997
Companion of Literature, RSL, 1998
The Critics' Circle Award for Distinguished Service to the Arts, 2000
Brianza Poetry Prize (Italy), 2000
South Bank Show Award for Outstanding Achievement in the Arts, 2001
S.T. Dupont Golden PEN Award, 2001 for a Lifetime's Distinguished Service to Literature
"Premio Fiesole ai Maestri del Cinema", Italy, 2001
World Leaders Award (World Leaders: A Festival of Creative Genius, Toronto), 2001
Hermann Kesten Prize for outstanding commitment on behalf of persecuted and imprisoned writers, awarded by German PEN (Berlin), 2001
Companion of Honour (CH) for services to Literature, 2002
Diploma ad Honorem, Teatro Filodrammatici (Milan), 2004
Evening Standard Awards, 50th Anniversary - Special Award, 2004
Wilfred Owen Poetry Prize, 2005
Franz Kafka Prize, 2005
Nobel Prize in Literature, 2005
Europe Theatre Prize, 2006
Serbian Foundation Prize, 2006
St. George Plaque of the City of Kragujevac, 2006
Legion d'honneur, France, 2007
Blue Plaque on his old home in Worthing, 2009

Honorary degrees
University of Reading, 1970
University of Birmingham, 1971
University of Glasgow, 1974
University of East Anglia, 1974
University of Stirling, 1979
Brown University, 1982
University of Hull, 1986
University of Sussex, 1990
University of East London, 1994
University of Sofia, 1995
University of Bristol, 1998
Goldsmiths, University of London, 1999
Aristotle University of Thessaloniki, 2000
University of Florence, 2001
University of Turin, 2002
National University of Ireland, 2004
University of Leeds, 2007
University of Kragujevac, 2008
University of Cambridge, 2008
Central School of Speech and Drama, 2008

Europe Theatre Prize 
In 2006, he was awarded the X Europe Theatre Prize, in Turin, with the following motivation:
Harold Pinter started out as an actor in 1951. In 2005 he won the Nobel Prize for Literature. In the intervening half-century he has been many things: playwright, screen-writer, director, poet and performer. But his greatest achievement has been to re-write the rules of drama. He has created poetry out of everyday speech with its pauses, hesitations and repetitions. He has constantly explored, like a theatrical Proust, the pervasive power of memory. And, in a sequence of remarkable plays from The Room (1957) to Celebration (2000), he has demolished the idea of the omniscient author: instead of manipulating character to a chosen end, Pinter presents the evidence as he sees it and allows the spectator freedom of interpretation. But, although Pinter is a true theatrical poet, his work and life are filled with a moral rage against injustice. He is a political writer, not in the sense of endorsing a party ideology but in his assault on the abuse of human dignity and the mis-use of language by those in power. There are many other facets to Pinter: the Cockney humourist, the skilled movie-writer, the heavyweight actor, the cricket-loving Englishman. But, if Pinter's plays are performed the world over, it is because they touch a universal chord. And what everyone recognises is that we live in a world of fear and anxiety briefly alleviated by memories of past happiness. Pinter speaks to audiences everywhere and to generations yet unborn; which makes him an ideal recipient of the Europe Theatre Prize.

See also
Characteristics of Harold Pinter's work
The Harold Pinter Archive in the British Library
List of people who have declined a British honour

Notes

Further reading

Billington, Michael.  Harold Pinter.  2nd ed.  London: Faber and Faber, 2007.   (13).   (10). Print.  (The official authorized biography.) [Updated ed. of The Life and Work of Harold Pinter  1996.  London: Faber and Faber, 1997.]
The Swedish Academy.  "Bio-bibliography": "Harold Pinter, Nobel Prize in Literature 2005".  NobelPrize.org.  The Swedish Academy and The Nobel Foundation, 2005.  Web.  5 January 2009.  (Contains both "Biobibliographical Notes" and "Bibliography", with the latter hyperlinked separately in site menu.)

External links

"Harold Pinter: Awards" – Biography at HaroldPinter.org: The Official Website of the International Playwright Harold Pinter.  (Through 2007; periodically updated.)
"Harold Pinter's Appearances, Publications, or Productions" – Harold Pinter Society Webpage.  (Periodically updated.)

Pinter, Harold
Harold Pinter
British literature-related lists